The Bhutan Broadcasting Service (BBS) is the state-owned radio and television service in Bhutan. A public service corporation which is fully funded by the state and it is the only service to offer both radio and television to the kingdom, and is the only television service to broadcast from inside the Bhutanese border. The use of telecommunications is currently governed through the Information, Communications and Media Act of 2006.

History
For many years, Bhutan did not have modern telecommunications. The first radio broadcasts commenced in November 1973, when the National Youth Association of Bhutan (NYAB) began radio transmissions of news and music for a half-hour each Sunday, under the name "Radio NYAB." The transmitter was first rented from a local telegraph office in Thimphu. The government took over Radio NYAB in 1979,  and renamed it the Bhutan Broadcasting Service in 1986, with expansions in radio scheduling as well as construction of a modern broadcast facility occurring in 1991.

For a long time, Bhutan was the only nation in the world to ban television. The first night of television broadcasts finally occurred on June 2, 1999, on the night of the Jigme Singye Wangchuck's silver jubilee.

Radio in Bhutan
Shortwave radio reached all of Bhutan in 1991. In June 2000, FM stations opened in the south and west of the country, expanding to central Bhutan in January 2001. By the end of 2005, FM radio service reached the entire country. Since November 2009, radio airs for 24 hours a day (23 hours and 21 minutes taking into account pauses and connection breaks), with the low listening times of 2 a.m. to 6 a.m. featuring repeats of the previous day's schedule. 14 hours and 45 minutes of each broadcast day is broadcast in Dzongkha, with 3 hours and 45 minutes broadcast in English, 2 hours and 53 minutes in Sharchop and an hour and 58 minutes in Nepali.

Television in Bhutan
BBS is the first television station in Bhutan.
News, documentaries, and entertainment programs were originally broadcast for one hour in the evening (7 p.m. to 8 p.m.), seven days a week, but expanded to four hours (6 p.m. to 10 p.m.) in December 2004. Once limited to the capital city, television service spread to the entire Kingdom via satellite in February 2006. It operates 31 TV stations across the country.

In 2008, BBS expanded their television schedule to air from 6 p.m. to 11 p.m. Most of the programming is aired in Dzongkha, but two current events and news programs each night are aired in English.

The programming from the previous night is repeated from 6 a.m. to 11 a.m. the next morning. Special entertainment and music request programs are also aired between 3 p.m. and 6 p.m. on Weekends.

BBS is expected to broadcasts all of its programs in high-definition format starting in January 2023 with its HD feed of BBS TV will be named as BBS HD.

Channels
 BBS TV (BBS 1) - BBS' flagship channel, it broadcasts news and current affairs, education, sports, and culture. It launched on June 2, 1999 as first television channel of Bhutan. The high-definition feed will be started broadcasting in January 2023.
 BBS 2 - BBS' general entertainment channel, it was launched in 2012. The high-definition feed will be started broadcasting in January 2023.
 BBS 3 - BBS' educational channel, it was launched in May 2020. The high-definition feed will be started broadcasting in January 2023.

Controversy
Although BBS is extremely popular among the Bhutanese people, mismanagement has plagued its growth. The government's attempts to keep its actions and content under its control include deputing senior civil servants as CEOs and toying with the annual budget string. Anchors suddenly disappear from the screen. One of the producers has sued the BBS in court.

On December 6, 2012, the Indian Intelligence Bureau red flagged the Bhutan Broadcasting Service as a hate channel among 24 others for beaming anti-India programmes. A proposal for action was sent to the Indian Ministry of Home Affairs.

See also
 Media of Bhutan
 Telecommunications in Bhutan

References

External links
BBS.bt – Official Website
Information, Communications and Media Act of 2006

Mass media in Bhutan
Radio networks
Radio stations in Bhutan
Television stations in Bhutan
Television channels and stations established in 1999
1973 establishments in Bhutan
Publicly funded broadcasters
Companies based in Thimphu